The Coleman Hills are a mountain range in Lake County, Oregon.

References 

Mountain ranges of Oregon
Mountain ranges of Lake County, Oregon